

357001–357100 

|-bgcolor=#f2f2f2
| colspan=4 align=center | 
|}

357101–357200 

|-id=116
| 357116 Attivissimo || 2001 WH || Paolo Attivissimo (born 1963), an Italian writer, blogger and journalist || 
|}

357201–357300 

|-bgcolor=#f2f2f2
| colspan=4 align=center | 
|}

357301–357400 

|-bgcolor=#f2f2f2
| colspan=4 align=center | 
|}

357401–357500 

|-bgcolor=#f2f2f2
| colspan=4 align=center | 
|}

357501–357600 

|-id=546
| 357546 Edwardhalbach ||  || Edward A. Halbach (1909–2011), a prominent amateur astronomer. || 
|}

357601–357700 

|-bgcolor=#f2f2f2
| colspan=4 align=center | 
|}

357701–357800 

|-bgcolor=#f2f2f2
| colspan=4 align=center | 
|}

357801–357900 

|-bgcolor=#f2f2f2
| colspan=4 align=center | 
|}

357901–358000 

|-bgcolor=#f2f2f2
| colspan=4 align=center | 
|}

References 

357001-358000